Colgrove v. Battin, 413 U.S. 149 (1973), was a United States Supreme Court case in which the Court ruled that six person civil juries were constitutional.

References

External links 
 Full text of the opinion at Justia.com

United States civil procedure case law
United States Supreme Court cases
1973 in United States case law
United States Seventh Amendment case law
Juries in the United States
United States Supreme Court cases of the Burger Court